The Conservative Party of Georgia (SKP) is a political party, active in Georgia since 2001.

Under its acting chairman Zviad Dzidziguri, the party was allied with Mikheil Saakashvili’s United National Movement until May 2004 when it switched into opposition, and with the Republican Party of Georgia formed the Democratic Front faction.

They joined other opposition parties in the 2007 anti-government demonstrations and supported a joint opposition candidate Levan Gachechiladze in the early 2008 presidential election.

The party from 2012 until 2019 was part of Georgian Dream Alliance. Georgian Dream won 2012 Election against United National Movement.

The party joined the Alliance of European Conservatives and Reformists on 1 November 2014.

Electoral performance

References

External links
Conservative Party of Georgia official website

2001 establishments in Georgia (country)
Alliance of Conservatives and Reformists in Europe member parties
Conservative parties in Georgia (country)
Centre-right parties in Georgia (country)
Georgian nationalism
Monarchism in Georgia (country)
National conservative parties
Nationalist parties in Georgia (country)
Political parties established in 2001
Political parties in Georgia (country)